Gallup was the first polling organization to conduct accurate opinion polling for United States presidential elections. Gallup polling has often been accurate in predicting the outcome of presidential elections and the margin of victory for the winner. However, it missed some close elections: 1948, 1976 and 2004, the popular vote in 2000, and the likely-voter numbers in 2012. The month section in the tables represents the month in which the opinion poll was conducted. D represents the Democratic Party, and R represents the Republican Party. Third parties, such as the Dixiecrats and the Reform Party, were included in some polls.

1936

After predicting the winners of the previous five elections, The Literary Digest (based on cards mailed in by its readers) predicted that Alf Landon would win by a large margin.
George Gallup predicted a Roosevelt win, based on statistical random sampling within 1.1 percent of the Literary Digest results.

The accuracy of Gallup's forecasts indicated the value of modern statistical methods; according to data collected in the Gallup poll, the Literary Digest poll failed primarily due to non-response bias (Roosevelt won 69 percent of Literary Digest readers who did not participate in the poll) rather than selection bias as commonly believed. Roosevelt won 57  percent of Literary Digest readers who received the poll. Roosevelt won in the largest landslide since the uncontested 1820 election, winning every state except Maine and Vermont, since his New Deal programs were popular with the American people (apart from the respondents to the Literary Digest poll). Although Landon said that the New Deal was costly and ineffective and Roosevelt was slowly molding the United States into a dictatorship, his attacks gained little traction.

1940

Throughout his campaign, Roosevelt promised to continue the New Deal and not bring the United States into any new wars if he was given another term. Willkie unsuccessfully attacked Roosevelt for seeking a third term and accused him of trying to turn the United States into a dictatorship by refusing to leave office. Roosevelt led in all polls, and was re-elected by a large margin.

1944

Roosevelt actively campaigned in this election against medical advice to counter Republican claims that he was near death. Roosevelt maintained a consistent (although sometimes narrow) lead in the polls, and won a solid victory due to American success in World War II and his continued popularity.

1948

While incumbent President Truman's popularity was low at the end of 1946, it improved with his attack on the "Do-Nothing" Republican Congress of 1947–1948 and his association of Dewey with it. Truman also energized segments of the Democratic base by ending segregation in the military and recognizing Israel. Gallup and other polling organizations stopped polling in mid-October, believing that Dewey would win the election, and failed to predict Truman's comeback or his subsequent victory.

1952

Dissatisfaction with the Korean War, corruption and the threat of Communism (the K1c2 formula) allowed World War II hero Eisenhower to win the election in a landslide after consistently leading in the polls, mostly by large margins.

1956

After consistently leading in the polls by large margins, incumbent President Eisenhower was easily re-elected due to economic prosperity at home and the end of the Korean War abroad.

1960

Polls throughout the campaign indicated a very close race. Incumbent Vice President Nixon initially led, but then had problems (a poor image in the first television debate and a knee injury which prevented him from campaigning) which gave Kennedy the lead in the polls for most of the campaign. In the end, Kennedy had an extremely close victory.

1964

Incumbent President Johnson maintained a large lead in the polls and won in a landslide due to popular sympathy after the assassination of John F. Kennedy, a good economy, lack of severe foreign problems, and an effective campaign to portray Goldwater as a dangerous, out-of-touch extremist.

1968

The campaign was always close according to the polls, but after the tumultuous 1968 Democratic Convention Nixon established and maintained a lead. American Independent candidate George Wallace ran in opposition to civil rights and in support of segregation and received considerable support in the South. Humphrey began catching up to Nixon in the polls late in the campaign, but ran out of time as Nixon won a narrow victory.

1972

Incumbent President Nixon was re-elected in a landslide, winning every state except Massachusetts after maintaining a large poll lead due to the economic recovery from the 1969–1970 recession and his portrayal of McGovern as a foreign-policy lightweight and social radical ("amnesty, abortion, and acid"). McGovern was also hurt by his change of vice-presidential candidates in mid-campaign, raising questions about his judgement.

1976

Carter opened up a large lead over incumbent President Ford due to dissatisfaction with Watergate, Ford's pardon of Nixon and the sluggish economy. Ford closed the gap near the end of the campaign with good debate performances, among other things. He was hurt by his comment that there was no Soviet domination of Eastern Europe and ran out of time to close the polling gap with Carter, who won by a narrow margin.

1980

During primary season, incumbent Jimmy Carter held a steady lead over Republican front-running California Governor Ronald Reagan. Reagan passed Carter in the polls after the primaries, winning over voters dissatisfied with Carter's handling of the economy, the energy crisis, and the Iran hostage crisis. As the race ended, Carter had apparently closed the gap with Reagan; some outlets gave him the lead. Reagan ran an upbeat campaign focused on fixing the economy and restoring America's image, diminished by Watergate and the war in Vietnam. Carter was more negative, attacking Reagan's record on civil rights and social issues, but Reagan easily defeated him.

1984

Reagan had low approval ratings early in his first term, but by 1983 the economy had improved enough to give him a boost for re-election. His challenger was former Vice President Walter Mondale, who advocated a nuclear freeze, the Equal Rights Amendment and a balanced budget. Mondale benefited from a strong first debate (where the 73-year-old Reagan seemed slow), but the Reagan-Bush ticket had a resounding election victory. Reagan again cast himself as the candidate of optimism, taking credit for an improved economy and an increase in national pride after the social upheaval of the 1960s and 1970s. Mondale's unpopular proposal to raise taxes to reduce the deficit and association with the Carter administration's "malaise" largely doomed his campaign from the start.

1988

Although Dukakis took a large lead in the initial polls, Vice President Bush's campaign portrayed him as soft on crime and used the good economy, Reagan's popularity and Bush's no new taxes pledge to close the gap and eventually take a large lead. Bush easily won the general election.

1992

The polls fluctuated during the spring and early summer, with incumbent President Bush and independent challenger Ross Perot trading the lead. Perot withdrew from the race in July, however, and Clinton took a consistent lead in the polls by blaming Bush for the poor economy and promising that he would fix it ("It's the economy, stupid"). Although Perot returned to the race in September, he could not regain his previous support and Clinton won the general election by a comfortable margin.

1996

Incumbent President Clinton held a comfortable lead in the polls throughout the campaign due to the good economy, stable international situation, and tying Dole to Newt Gingrich (the unpopular speaker of the House), easily winning the general election.

2000

The election was close throughout the campaign; Gore used the good economy to his advantage, but was hurt by being perceived as robotic and pompous. The Lewinsky scandal also might have hurt him, and helped Bush in the polls with voters concerned about moral values.

Despite multiple court challenges by the Gore campaign after a recount in Florida, the Supreme Court upheld the election; Bush won the Electoral College despite losing the popular vote by 0.51%.

2004

The election was closely contested, as dissatisfaction with the Iraq War and a sluggish economy helped Kerry. Bush accused Kerry of flip-flopping, however, and the Swift Boat Veterans for Truth accused Kerry of being unpatriotic.

A week before the election, al-Qaeda released a video warning Americans not to re-elect Bush. Bush's poll ratings in swing states then gave him a comfortable lead, and he was re-elected.

2008

The campaign was close during the spring and summer, with Obama and McCain trading the lead. The economy went into recession in December 2007, but Obama was initially hurt in the polls by Hillary Clinton supporters. The Republicans attacked him for being inexperienced, and McCain got a temporary bump in the polls after choosing Sarah Palin as his vice-presidential nominee. The financial crisis allowed Obama to open a consistent, comfortable lead in the polls at the beginning of October, however, and he won the election by a comfortable margin.

2012

President Obama and his campaign aired early negative ads calling Republican challenger Mitt Romney an out-of-touch, plutocratic, wealthy job destroyer since his days as CEO at Bain Capital. Romney bounced back in the polls after strong performances in the primaries and because the economy was still recovering from the 2007–2009 recession.

In April, after Obama publicly expressed his support of same-sex marriage and a story was published about Romney bullying a high-school classmate who was thought to be gay, Obama took larger leads in the polls. Romney and the Republicans attacked him for claiming that the economy was doing well, for welfare waivers, and China's unfair trade practices. The polls were close during most of the summer as Romney made several gaffes on a trip to Europe and Israel during the Olympics. He was also hurt by the release of a speech he delivered at a campaign fundraiser in which suggested that 47 percent of Americans, who did not pay federal income taxes, would "vote for the President, no matter what" because they felt "entitled to health care, to food, to housing - you name it."

After the conventions, Obama had a clear lead until he did poorly in the first debate. Romney took the lead, and the polls were tied in early and mid-October. The Democrats then regained their momentum; Obama won re-election by a relatively-close margin in the popular vote, but by a large margin in the Electoral College.

2016

 
Political outsider and businessman Donald Trump and former First Lady and Secretary of State Hillary Clinton were seen unfavorably by many pollsters and pundits, and it was predicted that Trump would lose by a large margin to Democratic opponent Clinton. Trump won over many white, blue-collar workers in the Great Lakes and Rust Belt regions (former Democratic strongholds), enabling him to win the Electoral College despite losing the popular vote by slightly over two percent.

2020

Former Vice President Joe Biden had been leading in most national polls, but President Donald Trump believed that the polls would underestimate him again. Although the polls had underestimated Trump's strength nationally and in Ohio, Florida, and Iowa, Biden won back the blue Midwestern states and made inroads in the Sun Belt to win the election.

See also
 Nationwide opinion polling for the 2008 United States presidential election
 Nationwide opinion polling for the 2012 United States presidential election
 Nationwide opinion polling for the 2016 United States presidential election
 Nationwide opinion polling for the 2020 United States presidential election

References

Presidential elections in the United States
Lists relating to the United States presidency
Opinion polling in the United States